Death Spell may refer to:

 Death Spells, an American electropunk band
 Deathspell Omega, a French black metal band